New Town Hall or New City Hall may refer to:
Toronto City Hall
New Town Hall (Bremen)
New Town Hall (Hanover)
New Town Hall (Leipzig)
New Town Hall (Munich)
New City Hall (Ostrava)
New Town Hall (Prague)
New Town Hall, Wiesbaden

Architectural disambiguation pages